"X-Ray Vision" is a song written by Pete Sinfield and Terry Taylor and first recorded by Moon Martin from his album Mystery Ticket. Martin's recording of the song credits Sinfield, Taylor and Martin as the writers.  It was later covered by the freestyle music group TKA, released as a single from the album Scars of Love in 1988. Their cover of the song -- credited to Sinfield and Taylor only -- reached No. 26 on the Billboard dance/club play chart. A music video was also produced for the song.

Track listing

 12" single

Charts

References

1988 singles
TKA songs
1982 songs
Songs with lyrics by Peter Sinfield